The Golden Projects are several e-government projects carried by the Government of the People's Republic of China. These projects include
The Golden Bridge Project, a project focused on commercial internet service.
The Golden Card Project, a project focused on building a national credit card network.
The Golden Custom Project, also known as Golden Gate Project, a project linking customs points through a national electronic data interchange (EDI) system, and promote paper-less trade.
The Golden Finance Project, a project to build a clearing house system.
The Golden Macro Project, a project focused on increasing sharing information between government bodies and helping decision making.
The Golden Shield Project, a project to increase central police control and responsiveness of public security.
The Golden Tax Project, a project focused on using information technology to crack down on tax evasion .

References
Governance in China By Irène Hors, Frédéric Langer, as seen in Google Book Search 

Politics and technology
Internet in China